Vasile Grecu (31 July 1885 – 27 May 1972) was a Romanian philologist and Byzantinist.

He became a corresponding member of the Romanian Academy in 1936. Between the years 1938-1947, he was a professor at the University of Bucharest. Grecu's works include critical editions of the works of the Greek historians Doukas, Kritoboulos of Imbros, George Sphrantzes and Constantine Porphyrogenitus.

References 
 Waldemar Ceran, "Grecu Vasilije", Encyklopedia kultury bizantyńskiej (Warsaw: Oktawiusz Jurewicz, 2002), p. 189.

1885 births
1972 deaths
Romanian Byzantinists
Corresponding members of the Romanian Academy
Academic staff of the University of Bucharest
20th-century Romanian historians

Scholars of Byzantine history